The 1994 Greenwich Council election took place on 5 May 1994 to elect members of Greenwich London Borough Council in London, England. The whole council was up for election and the Labour party stayed in overall control of the council.

Background

Election result

Ward results

References

1994
1994 London Borough council elections
May 1994 events in the United Kingdom